2014 J.League Cup Final was the 22nd final of the J.League Cup competition. The final was played at Saitama Stadium 2002 in Saitama on November 8, 2014. Gamba Osaka won the championship.

Match details

See also
2014 J.League Cup

References

J.League Cup
J.League Cup Final
J.League Cup Final
Gamba Osaka matches
Sanfrecce Hiroshima matches